IDW Publishing is an American comic book publishing house. They are known, in particular, for the popular horror franchise 30 Days of Night, as well as producing comics based on licensed media, such as G.I. Joe, The Transformers, CSI, Star Trek and Teenage Mutant Ninja Turtles.

Titles

0–9

A

B

C

D

E

F

G

H

I

J

K

L

M

N

O

P

R

S

T

U

V

W

X

Y

Z

References

External links 
 IDW Publishing title listing
 
 

IDW Publishing